Airstream Jets, Inc. is a private jet charter company founded in 2008 with headquarters in Boca Raton, Florida. The company is a member of the National Business Aviation Association (NBAA). 

The company is known for its Distance Card jet card program and its on-demand private jet charter services. The Distance Card sells aircraft flights based on distance flown, rather than on hours as most other charter operators do. Pricing for Distance Card users is based on an algorithm that takes in a variety of factors and also provides pricing for 250 international destinations.

History
Airstream Jets was founded in 2008 by Peter Maestrales. In 2019 Airstream Jets expanded to the Northeast U.S. with the opening of an office at Signature Flight Support’s south terminal at Teterboro Airport in New Jersey.

Services
Airstream Jets specializes in providing aircraft and crews for on-demand private air charter, pro & collegiate sports team travel, VIP airliner charter for international delegations and air medical services. They also conduct private jet management, corporate aircraft purchases and provide business aviation market intelligence.

References

External links
 Airstream Jets Inc. (USA) official website
 Airstream Jets (Asia-Pacific) official website

Charter airlines of the United States
Companies based in Florida
Companies based in Boca Raton, Florida
Airlines based in Florida